Yacolla is a genus of South American tangled nest spiders containing the single species, Yacolla pikelinae. It was  first described by Pekka T. Lehtinen in 1967, and has only been found in Brazil.

References

Amaurobiidae
Monotypic Araneomorphae genera
Spiders of Brazil
Taxa named by Pekka T. Lehtinen